Emre Mutlu is a Turkish Greco-Roman wrestler competing in the 55 kg division. He is a member of Kayseri Şeker Club.

Career 
In 2022, he won one of the bronze medals in the men's 55 kg event at the European Wrestling Championships held in Budapest, Hungary. He won the gold medal in his event at the 2022 European U23 Wrestling Championship held in Plovdiv, Bulgaria.

Major results

References

External links
 

Turkish male sport wrestlers
Living people
2003 births
European Wrestling Championships medalists
People from Kayseri
21st-century Turkish people